Hotham may refer to:

Places

Australia
Hotham, Northern Territory, a locality
Division of Hotham, Australian electoral division
Mount Hotham, Australia
The original name of North Melbourne, Victoria, Australia

Elsewhere
Hotham, East Riding of Yorkshire, England
Hotham, Ontario
Hotham Park, Bognor Regis, England

People
Alan Geoffrey Hotham (1876–1965), Royal Navy officer and cricketer
Beaumont Hotham, 3rd Baron Hotham (1794–1870), British soldier, peer, and Member of Parliament
Charles Hotham (1806–1855), Governor of Victoria, Australia
Sir Charles Frederick Hotham (1843–1925), British Royal Navy Admiral who was Commander-in-Chief, Portsmouth
Henry Hotham (1777–1833), British naval officer who served during the Napoleonic Wars
John Hotham (1589–1645), Parliamentarian military leader of the English Civil War who sought an accommodation with the Royalist side
John Hotham the younger (1610–1645), son of the above, an English Member of Parliament during the English Civil War
John Hotham (bishop) (died 1337), English medieval Bishop of Ely
John de Hotham (died 1361), English medieval university chancellor
Richard Hotham (1722–1799) East India merchant, property developer and politician
Thomas Hotham (fl. 1320s), English medieval university chancellor
William Hotham, 1st Baron Hotham (1736–1813), British admiral who saw service during the American Revolutionary War and French Revolutionary Wars
William Hotham (1772–1848), British naval officer who saw service during the French Revolutionary and Napoleonic Wars

Ships
, the name of more than one ship of the British Royal Navy 
, the name of more than one United States Navy ship

See also
 de Hotham